Katheryn McCormack (born February 16, 1974) was a member of the 1998 Canadian Olympic women's team that participated in ice hockey at the 1998 Winter Olympics, winning a silver medal. She played with the Canadian National team from 1997 to 2001.

Playing career
At the age of eight, McCormack started playing hockey on boys teams. The first time that she played on a team consisting of girls was at the 1991 Canada Winter Games for New Brunswick. She was a Team Canada member at the U.S. Olympic Festival in 1993 in San Antonio, Texas 

At the 1995 Canadian championships, McCormack played with the New Brunswick provincial team and won a silver medal. The following year, she would win a bronze medal at the Canadian championships. In 1996, she joined the Maritimes Sports Blades. One of her teammates was future Olympian Stacy Wilson.

In 1999 she moved to Oakville, Ontario to skate with the Oakville Ice of the National Women's Hockey League. On November 27, 2009, McCormack carried the Olympic torch through her hometown of Blackville, New Brunswick in preparation for the 2010 Winter Olympics in Vancouver. Kathy plays recreational hockey for the Leaside Wildcats.

Career stats

References

1974 births
Living people
Canadian women's ice hockey forwards
Ice hockey people from New Brunswick
Ice hockey players at the 1998 Winter Olympics
Medalists at the 1998 Winter Olympics
Olympic ice hockey players of Canada
Olympic medalists in ice hockey
Olympic silver medalists for Canada
People from Northumberland County, New Brunswick